Qinghai University Medical College is a university in Xining, Qinghai, China.

References
Official site 

Universities and colleges in Qinghai
Xining